The Listeriaceae are a family of Gram-positive bacteria. The cells are short rods and can form filaments. They are aerobic or facultative anaerobic. Spores are not formed. Some species can cause human and animal listeriosis.

References

 
Gram-positive bacteria